Yeh Ishq is a Pakistani drama television series directed by Badar Mehmood, written by Asma Sayani. It originally aired on ARY Digital in 2016-17.

Cast
Asma Abbas 
Natalia Awais as Neha
Anum Ahmed as Mishkaat
Shahzad Noor as Maaz
Sajid Hassan
Atiqa Odho
Shaheen Zamali
Zainab Qayyum
Shaista Jabeen
Qavi Khan
other

Plot
If it is true love it will find its way. "Yeh Ishq" is a love story of Maaz and Mishkaat . Mishkaat is a young and energetic girl with full of life. She falls in love with Maaz and promises him to be his bride. On the other hand, Maaz who madly loves Mishkaat and wants her to be with him for the rest of his life is a stubborn child of the family who would go out of his way to make things work out for him.

Maaz's aunt is the sole decision maker of the family and does not want Maaz marry Mishkaat because she wants everything to be according to her wish. Furthermore, another character – Neha who's a very decent girl loves Maaz and everybody in the family, even Maaz's aunty wants her to be his bride. However first Mishkat disagrees to this wedding because of her mom and she gets engaged to another guy who loves her. It is a wedding of one of their friends Mishkaats fiancé forgets to pick her up so as Maaz is there he offers to give her a lift. Instead he takes her to his farmhouse and forces her to do nikkah with him. She disagrees and cries but he goes mental and has to make Mishkat his hence the nikkah happens.

The story goes through ups and downs with countless twists and turns.

Soundtrack

The title song was sung by Rahat Fateh Ali Khan. The music was composed by and the lyrics were written by Asma Sayani.

Accolades

References

Pakistani drama television series
2016 Pakistani television series debuts
2017 Pakistani television series endings
ARY Digital original programming
ARY Digital